The 1973–74 Vancouver Canucks season was the team's 4th in the NHL. Vancouver finished 7th in the East Division for the third consecutive season, failing to reach the playoffs. Before the season started Bud Poile, the Canucks first general manager, left the team to become an executive with the World Hockey Association. Hal Laycoe, the first coach of the Canucks, was named Poile's replacement.

Regular season

Final standings

Schedule and results

Playoffs
The Canucks did not qualify for the playoffs.

Player statistics

Awards and records

Trophies and awards
Cyclone Taylor Award (Canucks MVP): Gary Smith
Cyrus H. McLean Trophy (Canucks Leading Scorer): Andre Boudrias
Babe Pratt Trophy (Canucks Outstanding Defenceman): Jocelyn Guevremont
Fred J. Hume Award (Canucks Unsung Hero): Don Lever
Most Exciting Player Award: Don Lever

Draft picks
Vancouver's picks at the 1973 NHL Amateur Draft. The draft was held at the Mount Royal Hotel in Montreal, Quebec.

See also
1973–74 NHL season

References

 

Vancouver Canucks seasons
Vanc
Vanc